Jorge Cordova is the name of:

 Jorge Córdova (1822–1862), military officer and constitutional President of Bolivia (1855–1857)
 Jorge Luis Córdova (1907–1994), Puerto Rico's eleventh Resident Commissioner, Associate Justice of the Supreme Court of Puerto Rico, and lawyer
 Jorge Cordova (American football) (born 1981), college and National Football League linebacker
 Jorge Córdova (footballer), Chilean footballer